"Daughter of Darkness" is a single by Tom Jones released in 1970 from his album, I Who Have Nothing. The single was a top ten hit in the UK, peaking at number five. In the United States and Canada, Jones just missed the top ten with "Daughter of Darkness", peaking at number 13 and number 11, respectively. The song went to number one in the United States on the Billboard Easy Listening chart in June 1970, and was Tom Jones final of three number ones on the chart. Elton John, who was working as a session musician at that time, also sang on the song.

Chart history

Weekly charts

Year-end charts

See also
List of number-one adult contemporary singles of 1970 (U.S.)

References

1970 songs
1970 singles
Tom Jones (singer) songs
Decca Records singles
Number-one singles in South Africa
Songs written by Geoff Stephens
Songs written by Les Reed (songwriter)